Parabyrsopolis is a genus of beetles in the family Scarabaeidae.

References  

Scarabaeidae genera
Rutelinae